This is a list of the governors of the province of Samangan, Afghanistan.

See also
 List of current governors of Afghanistan

References

Samangan